"The Fear of Being Alone" is a song written by Walt Aldridge and Bruce Miller, and recorded by American country music singer Reba McEntire.  It was released in September 1996 as the first single from her 22nd album, What If It's You (1996). The song peaked at #2 on the US Billboard Hot Country Singles & Tracks chart.

Critical reception
Deborah Evans Price from Billboard wrote, "McEntire's last album of cover tunes spawned only one top 10 single, but this first single from her new disc signals a return to original form. The lyric paints a picture of two disillusioned people tentatively approaching a new relationship, and McEntire's vocal performance infuses the song with a mixture of hope and caution. Penned by Walt Aldridge and Bruce Miller, it's a strong song, and McEntire's vibrant performance should serve her well at country radio."

Music video
The accompanying music video for "The Fear of Being Alone" was directed by Dominic Orlando, and premiered in late 1996. It was filmed at Starstruck Studios, and features Reba singing at a recording studio.

Chart performance
The song debuted at #41 on the Hot Country Singles chart for the week of October 5, 1996 and peaked at #2 for the week of December 7, 1996, behind Alan Jackson's "Little Bitty". It stayed at #2 for three weeks. It stayed in the Top Ten for 10 weeks.

Charts

Weekly charts

Year-end charts

References

1996 singles
1996 songs
Reba McEntire songs
Songs written by Walt Aldridge
MCA Records singles